Perspectives on Psychological Science is a bimonthly peer-reviewed academic journal of psychology. It is published by SAGE Publications on behalf of the Association for Psychological Science. The journal was established in 2006 and the editor-in-chief is Klaus Fiedler (University of Heidelberg). The founding editor was Ed Diener (University of Illinois at Urbana-Champaign). Members of the Association for Psychological Science receive the journal as part of their membership.

The journal is a member of the Committee on Publication Ethics (COPE).

Abstracting and indexing
The journal is abstracted and indexed in:

According to the Journal Citation Reports, the journal has a 2021 impact factor of 11.621.

References

External links

SAGE Publishing academic journals
English-language journals
Psychology journals
Association for Psychological Science academic journals
Bimonthly journals
Publications established in 2006